The miner's cap is part of the traditional miner's costume. It consists of a white material (linen) and served in the Middle Ages to protect the miner when descending below ground (unter Tage). Later it was replaced by the miner's hat (Fahrhut or Schachthut), from which the leather cap or helmet were developed and subsequently today's mining helmets.

See also 
 Miner's habit
Mooskappe - miner's cap from the Harz Mountains

Literature 

Caps
Miners' clothing